Bud Powell in Paris is a studio album by jazz pianist Bud Powell, recorded in Paris for Reprise in February 1963 and released in 1964. It was produced by Duke Ellington.

Alternates and outtakes from the session were released by Mythic Sound on Earl Bud Powell, Vol. 6: Writin' for Duke, 63.

Track listing 
 "How High the Moon" (Morgan Lewis, Nancy Hamilton) – 3:54
 "Dear Old Stockholm" (traditional) – 3:53
 "Body and Soul" (Johnny Green, Edward Heyman, Robert Sour, Frank Eyton) – 6:05
 "Jor-Du" (Duke Jordan) – 4:18

 "Reets and I" (Benny Harris) – 3:43
 "Satin Doll" (Duke Ellington, Billy Strayhorn, Johnny Mercer) – 4:45
 "Parisian Thoroughfare" (Bud Powell) – 1:56
 "I Can't Get Started" (Vernon Duke, Ira Gershwin) – 5:40
 "Little Benny" (aka "Bud's Bubble") (Harris) – 3:31
 "Indiana" (James Hanley, Ballard MacDonald) – 4:37 (not on original LP)
 "Blues in B Flat" (aka "B Flat Blues" and "Bud's Blue Bossa") (Powell) – 6:59 (not on original LP)

Personnel

Performance 
 Bud Powell – piano
 Gilbert Rovere – bass
 Kansas Fields – drums

Production 
 Duke Ellington – producer
 Leonard Feather – liner notes
 Donald Leake – cover painting
 Lee Herschberg – digital mastering

References 

Bud Powell albums
1964 albums
Reprise Records albums
Albums produced by Duke Ellington